Cay Sal Bank is the third largest (after Great Bahama Bank and Little Bahama Bank) and the westernmost of the Bahama Banks. It is located between 23º27'N - 24º10'N and 079º25'W – 080º35'W. In a geographical sense, it is separate from the Bahamas proper as it is much closer to Cuba (from which it is separated by Nicholas Channel, at a distance of ) than to the closest Bahamian island.

The closest point of any other named Bahamian land to the bank is Orange Cay, the southernmost island of the Bimini Chain.

Geography

With a surface of  it is one of the largest atolls of the world. Among the atolls with some land area (i.e. disregarding totally submerged atoll structures), Cay Sal Bank is second only to Great Chagos Bank. The individual islands (i.e. islets or cays) are 96 in number.

Cay Sal Bank has numerous islets along its rim, except along the south side facing Nicholas Channel, where it has only rocky coral heads.

Features

The islands, rocks and reefs along the rim of the atoll are listed clockwise from southwest to southeast. There are also a number of smaller, unnamed cays or rocks. Some of the historical Spanish language names of the features of the bank were replaced by English names when the Bahamas became a British Crown colony in the 18th century.

Lavenderas Rocks, . It is a submerged reef to the ESE of Cay Sal Island.
Cay Sal, . In its interior is a large salt pond commonly replenished by heavy wind-driven seas that broach the islet along its southwest side. It is covered with stunted palm trees and marked by several dilapidated buildings standing on its west side. This cay gives the name to the whole bank in the English language.
Rompidas Ledge,  (submerged). The cargo ship M/V Cork ran aground there in 1983, and position is marked by its wreck.
The compact group formed by Elbow Cays, Crenula Cay, Double Headed Shot Cays, Water Cays and Marion Rock is known in Spanish as Los Roques. These northwestern cays gave their name to the whole bank in the Spanish language.
Elbow Cays,  are the westernmost group, running southwest to northeast along the Straits of Florida. The southernmost cays of the group consist of unnamed islets and rocks. Northeast of these are South Elbow Cay (the westernmost named cay of Cay Sal Bank) and North Elbow Cay, sometimes known just as Elbow Cay.
Crenula Cay 
Double Headed Shot Cays, . The Double Headed Shot Cays are a group of elongated cays that extend northeastward from the Elbow Cays, incorporating the Water Cays and all islets and reefs up to the Deadman Cays.  They are in a position on the northwest side of Cay Sal Bank where the Florida Current, in its course east and north through the Straits of Florida, usually sets close offshore at full strength.
Water Cays (West Water Cay and East Water Cay), . These cays were mentioned by Alexander Von Humboldt.
Marion Rock,  (submerged). Located of the northern coast of the 'Los Roques' reef.
Deadman Cays, 
Muertos Cays, located between the 'Los Roques' and the Dog Rocks.
Dog Rocks,,  the northeasternmost island/reef group.
Damas Cays,  Located on the approximate centre of the eastern side of the bank.
Dangerous Shoals or 'Dangerous Rocks'
North Dangerous Shoals, 
South Dangerous Shoal, 
Bellows Cay, 
Anguilla Cays, . Anguilla Cays, near the southeast extremity of Cay Sal Bank, consist of several elongated, scrub-covered, sandy islands which are swampy near their southern end, and are marked here and there by stunted palm trees. The northern end of Anguilla Cays is marked by a beacon, 5 m high. Anguilla Cay is the name of the northern and second largest of the Anguilla Cays. Cotton Cay (sometimes just South Anguilla Cay) is the largest and southernmost of the Anguilla Cays. Between the two is the much smaller Middle Cay. In early 2021 three Cubans were stranded on one of the Anguilla Cays for 33 days after their boat was capsized by a storm. The three survived on coconuts, conches and rats for more than a month until their rescue by the US Coast Guard on February 9, after being spotted waving a makeshift flag by a routine patrol flight the day before.

History
Spanish navigators visited the area plotting it for the first time on a map in 1511 as Los Roques and it was mapped by subsequent cartographers often with its adjacent Placer. The atoll was subsequently claimed for the Spanish crown by Juan Ponce de León. The bank was under the Spanish rule for about two centuries until 1718 when the Bahamas became a Crown colony of the British Empire. In 1825 Alexander Von Humboldt highlighted that the 'Salt Cays' were a danger for navigation, but that the waters had been previously well charted by Francisco de Seixas in 1692:

Cay Sal Lighthouse, a tall stone lighthouse was built by the British on the island of North Elbow Cay in 1839 along with some small buildings. It marked the southern entrance to the Florida Straits from the Gulf of Mexico and was active until the 1940s. The abandoned lighthouse was briefly reactivated during the 1970s, when the Royal Bahamas Defence Force set up a post on nearby Cay Sal Island to watch for drug smugglers. The small outpost on Cay Sal island included the only airstrip on Cay Sal Bank and was kept from the 1960s to late 1970s.

The United States Coast Guard constantly monitors Cay Sal Bank for refugees from Cuba. Cay Sal is about thirty miles away from the northern Cuban coast and many Cubans attempting to cross the Straits of Florida on makeshift boats and rafts reached North Elbow Cay and wrote their names in the ruins of the lighthouse. Refugees rescued on the island have included pregnant women and children and are reported to have employed a variety of craft including small, ill-equipped boats, in spite of the possibility of pursuit by the Cuban military. In February 2021, the U.S. Coast Guard rescued three Cuban castaways who had survived for thirty-three days on Anguilla Cay, subsisting only on coconuts.

Currently Cay Sal Bank is known for its many excellent scuba diving spots, but good weather is needed in order to approach the reefs without danger.

Cartography
Ancient maps and nautical charts show Los Roques or Elbow Cays with or without the Placer or Pracel to the east. In the older maps the size of the cays and their adjacent bank was often exaggerated and merged with the Great Bahama Bank.

See also
Cay Sal Airport
Operation 40
Placer (geography)

References

External links

Atoll Research Bulletin
Sailing Directions
1996 Turtle Symposium
Islets and features, with coordinates
video of C6ARI DXpedition to Cay Sal Bank, January 2007

Islands of the Bahamas
Lists of coordinates
Undersea banks of the Atlantic Ocean
Atolls of the Bahamas
Bimini